The Poncione d'Arzo is a mountain of the Lugano Prealps, located on the border between Switzerland and Italy, about 250 meters east of Monte Pravello. It lies south of Lake Lugano, on the group culminating at Monte San Giorgio.

References

External links
 Poncione d'Arzo on Hikr

Mountains of the Alps
Mountains of Ticino
Mountains of Lombardy
Mountains of Switzerland
One-thousanders of Switzerland